The discography of English singer and songwriter Amy Winehouse consists of two studio albums, two live albums, one compilation album, five extended plays, 14 singles (including three as a featured artist), three video albums and 14 music videos. At the time of her death on 23 July 2011, Winehouse had sold over 1.75 million singles and over 3.98 million albums in the United Kingdom. Meanwhile, she had sold about 3.4 million tracks and 2.7 million albums in the United States as of the same date.

Winehouse's debut album, Frank, was released in October 2003 and peaked at number three on the UK Albums Chart. However, none of the four singles released from the album managed to reach the top 50 of the UK Singles Chart. Her second album, Back to Black, was released in October 2006, reaching number one on the UK Albums Chart and number seven on the Billboard 200 in the United States. The album was certified 11-times platinum by the British Phonographic Industry (BPI) and was the best-selling album of 2007 in the UK. The first single from the album, "Rehab", peaked at number seven in the UK and at number nine on the Billboard Hot 100 in the US. The album's second single, "You Know I'm No Good", reached number 18 in the UK. Other singles included the title track, which peaked at number eight in the UK, "Tears Dry on Their Own" and "Love Is a Losing Game". A deluxe edition of the album was released in the UK in November 2007 and also topped the UK chart. By October 2018, Back to Black had sold 3.93 million copies, becoming the 13th best-selling album in the UK of all time.

Winehouse collaborated with other artists, as a vocalist on the song "Valerie" on Mark Ronson's solo album, Version. The song peaked at number two in the UK. She also collaborated with former Sugababes member Mutya Buena on "B Boy Baby", the final single from Buena's debut solo album, Real Girl. Winehouse's last studio recording was the song "Body and Soul", a duet with Tony Bennett. The song appears on Winehouse's posthumous compilation album Lioness: Hidden Treasures and Bennett's album Duets II. In 2015, the critically acclaimed documentary film Amy, which depicts the life and death of Winehouse, spawned an original soundtrack of the same name that includes Winehouse's well known tracks, previously unheard tracks, rare live sessions, covers and tracks created by film composer Antônio Pinto. It is Winehouse's second posthumous compilation album. The soundtrack peaked at number 19 on the UK Albums Chart.

Albums

Studio albums

Live albums

Compilation albums

Remix albums

Soundtrack albums

Box sets

Extended plays

Singles

As lead artist

As featured artist

Other charted and certified songs

Guest appearances

Videography

Video albums

Music videos

Notes

References

External links
 
 
 

Discography
Discographies of British artists
Rhythm and blues discographies
Soul music discographies
Vocal jazz discographies

fr:Amy Winehouse#Discographie